Marcus Furius Bibaculus (103 BC? BC), was a Roman poet, who flourished during the last century of the Republic.

Life
According to Jerome, he was born at Cremona, and probably lived to a great age. He wrote satirical poems after the manner of Catullus, whose bitterness he rivaled, according to Quintilian (Instit. x.i.196), in his iambics. He even attacked Augustus (and perhaps Caesar), who treated the matter with indifference. He was also author of prose Lucubrationes and perhaps of an epic poem on Caesar's Gallic Wars (Pragmatia Belli Gallici). 

Otto Ribbeck attributes to him one of the shorter poems usually assigned to Virgil. It is doubtful whether he is the person ridiculed by Horace (Satires, ii.5.40) and whether he is identical with the turgidus Alpinus (Satires, i.10.36), the author of an Aethiopis dealing with the life and death of Memnon and of a poem on the Rhine. Some critics, on the ground that Horace would not have ventured to attack so dangerous an adversary, assume the existence of a poet whose real name was Furius (or Cornelius) Alpinus.

Bibaculus was ridiculed for his high-flown and exaggerated style and manner of expression. Fragments of his work can be found in L. Müller's edition of Catullus' work in the Teubner Series (1870).

See also
Roman poetry

Footnotes

Citations
 This work in turn cites:
Weichert, “De M. Furio Bibaculo,” in his Poetarum Latinorum Reliquiae (1830)

External links

103 BC births
1st-century BC deaths
Ancient Roman poets
Golden Age Latin writers
2nd-century BC Romans
1st-century BC Romans
1st-century BC Roman poets
Bibaculus
Year of death unknown
Writers from Cremona